Rhombus are a dub/drum and bass/reggae/roots band from Wellington, New Zealand.

They were formed in 2001 by Thomas Voyce and Simon Rycroft, later joined by Ahmen Mahal aka Imon Star (who departed from the group in 2007 to pursue his solo project Olmecha Supreme) and Koa Williams (Roots Foundation Sound System founding member). The band has toured extensively in their native New Zealand along with a few international dates, notably in Japan (2002) and in Australia, playing twice at the Sydney Opera House in November 2004. They also performed at the Big Day Out in 2006.
Over the years, the band has performed with such acts as St Germain, Fat Freddy's Drop, Salmonella Dub, Michael Franti, Dry & Heavy, Trinity Roots, Gomez, Kora, Shapeshifter, and Katchafire.

Rhombus have given their time to a number of causes including Greenpeace, Tsunami Relief, SurfAid International, the Cancer Society, and the Peace Boat. Their travels on the Japanese-based global NGO Peace Boat have taken them through the Caribbean, with the intent of "spreading the values of sustainability, co-operation and peace through music workshops".

In 2003, they won three awards at the bNet NZ Music Awards for "Best Video", "Best Electronic Release", and "Best Album".  Their 2003 album Bass Player was their most successful with regard to chart position, peaking at #18 in the New Zealand Top 40 Albums charts.

Discography

References

New Zealand reggae musical groups